The Tacoma Daily Index is a daily business newspaper in Tacoma, Washington, United States. The Daily Index publishes legal notices, property sales, calls for bids, permits, and court information pertaining to Tacoma and Pierce County. It is published by Sound Publishing, a regional newspaper chain.

The Daily Index was founded on May 1, 1890, as the Daily Mortgage and Lien Record.

References

External links

Newspapers published in Washington (state)